Pablo Baeza (born 11 November 1988) is a Chilean handball player for BM Usab and the Chilean national team.

He participated at the 2017 World Men's Handball Championship.

References

1988 births
Living people
Chilean male handball players
South American Games bronze medalists for Chile
South American Games medalists in handball
Competitors at the 2018 South American Games
Pan American Games medalists in handball
Pan American Games bronze medalists for Chile
Handball players at the 2007 Pan American Games
Handball players at the 2015 Pan American Games
Medalists at the 2015 Pan American Games
21st-century Chilean people
20th-century Chilean people